Waterhouse Island may refer to:

 Little Waterhouse Island, Australia
 Waterhouse Island (Tasmania), Australia
 Waterhouse Island (Antarctica), a small island near Davis Station named for Medical Officer Dr Robbin Waterhouse in 1971.